João de Almeida Pereira Filho (born 3 July 1947) is a Brazilian footballer. He competed in the men's tournament at the 1968 Summer Olympics.

References

External links
 
 

1947 births
Living people
Brazilian footballers
Brazil international footballers
Olympic footballers of Brazil
Footballers at the 1968 Summer Olympics
Footballers from São Paulo
Association football defenders
Sport Club Corinthians Paulista players